Futbol Club Barcelona C was a Spanish football team that folded on 2 July 2007. The youth team of FC Barcelona, it played its home games at the Mini Estadi.

Founded in 1967 as Barcelona Amateur, it adopted the name FC Barcelona C in 1993. Unlike the English League, youth teams in Spain play in the same football pyramid as their senior team rather than a separate league. However youth and reserve teams cannot play in the same division as their senior teams.

FC Barcelona last played in the fourth division. They were ineligible for promotion to the third level, as FC Barcelona B were playing in that category. Club president Joan Laporta chose not to inscribe the team in Primera Catalana for 2007–08, after the B team dropped to the fourth level.

Honours 
 Generalitat Cup: 1984
 Fourth Division: 1983–84, 1986–87, 1997–98, 1998-98
 Campeonato de España de Aficionados: 1949, 1952, 1961, 1971, 1980, 1982

Season to season 

 5 seasons in Segunda División B
 25 seasons in Tercera División

Notable players

References

External links 
 

C
Barcelona C
Barcelona C
Barcelona C
Association football clubs disestablished in 2007
1967 establishments in Spain
2007 disestablishments in Spain